Mohamed Medfai (born 8 August 2000) is a French footballer who plays as a midfielder for Portuguese club Marítimo Sub-23.

Career

Gazélec Ajaccio
Medfai made his professional debut with Gazélec Ajaccio in a 3–1 Coupe de la Ligue loss to AJ Auxerre on 14 August 2018.

Olimpia Grudziądz
On 5 September 2019, Medfai joined Polish club Olimpia Grudziądz.

Marítimo
On 6 October 2020, he joined Portuguese club Marítimo. He was assigned to the reserve team Marítimo Sub-23.

References

External links
 
 
 

2000 births
Footballers from Marseille
Living people
Association football midfielders
French footballers
Gazélec Ajaccio players
Olimpia Grudziądz players
C.S. Marítimo players
I liga players
French expatriate footballers
Expatriate footballers in Poland
French expatriate sportspeople in Poland
Expatriate footballers in Portugal
French expatriate sportspeople in Portugal